Oribatida (formerly Cryptostigmata), also known as oribatid mites, moss mites or beetle mites, are an order of mites, in the "chewing Acariformes" clade Sarcoptiformes. There are currently 12,000 species that have been identified, but researchers estimate that there may be anywhere from 60,000 to 120,000 total species. Oribatid mites are by far the most prevalent of all arthropods in forest soils, and are essential for breaking down organic detritus and distributing fungi.

Oribatid mites generally have low metabolic rates, slow development and low fecundity. Species are iteroparous with adults living a relatively long time; for example, estimates of development time from egg to adult vary from several months to two years in temperate forest soils. Oribatid mites have six active instars: prelarva, larva, three nymphal instars and the adult. All these stages after the prelarva feed on a wide variety of material including living and dead plant and fungal material, lichens and carrion; some are predatory, but none is parasitic and feeding habits may differ between immatures and adults of the same species. Many species have a mineralized exoskeleton.

The Oribatida are of economic importance as hosts of various tapeworm species, and by increasing the breakdown of organic material in the soil, in a similar manner to earthworms. 

Many species of oribatid mites require extremely specific habitats, resulting in large diversity within the order due to the many niches they evolve to. Some species are especially suited to dry conditions, or on bare lichen covered rocks, but that largest section of Oribatida prefers the moist forest floor and its accompanying litter. There are a small number of species who have evolved to live on aquatic plants, often spending the majority of their life submersed underwater.

In contrast to the commonly held view that parthenogenetic lineages are short lived, four species-rich parthenogenetic clusters of the order Oribatida are very ancient and likely arose 400-300 million years ago.

Systematics
The order Oribatida is divided into the following taxa:

Palaeosomata Grandjean, 1969

 Acaronychoidea Grandjean, 1932 (6 genera)
 Acaronychidae Grandjean, 1932

 Palaeacaroidea Grandjean, 1932 (8 genera)
 Palaeacaridae Grandjean, 1932

Parhyposomata Balogh & Mahunka, 1979

 Parhypochthonioidea Grandjean, 1969 (3 genera)
 Parhypochthoniidae Grandjean, 1969
 Gehypochthoniidae Strenzke, 1963
 Elliptochthoniidae Norton, 1975

Enarthronota Grandjean, 1947

 Hypochthonoidea Berlese, 1910 (c. 8 genera)
 Hypochthoniidae Berlese, 1910
 Eniochthoniidae Grandjean, 1947
 Arborichthoniidae Balogh & Balogh, 1992

 Brachychthonoidea Thor, 1934 (c. 11 genera)
 Brachychthoniidae Thor, 1934

 Cosmochthonioidea Grandjean, 1947 (c. 14 genera)
 Cosmochthoniidae Grandjean, 1947
 Heterochthoniidae Grandjean, 1954
 Haplochthoniidae Hammen, 1959
 Pediculochelidae Lavoipierre, 1946
 Sphaerochthoniidae Grandjean, 1947

 Atopochthonioidea Grandjean, 1949 (3 genera)
 Atopochthoniidae Grandjean, 1949
 Pterochthoniidae Grandjean, 1950
 Phyllochthoniidae Travé, 1967

 Protoplophoroidea Ewing, 1917 (c. 7 genera)
 Protoplophoridae Ewing, 1917

Mixonomata Grandjean, 1969

 Dichosomata Balogh & Mahunka, 1979

 Nehypochthonioidea Norton & Metz, 1980
 Nehypochthoniidae Norton & Metz, 1980

 Perlohmannioidea Grandjean, 1954
 Perlohmaniidae Grandjean, 1954
 Collohmanniidae Grandjean, 1958

 Eulohmannioidea Grandjean, 1931
 Eulohmanniidae Grandjean, 1931

 Epilohmannioidea Oudemans, 1923
 Epilohmanniidae Oudemans, 1923

 Lohmannioidea Berlese, 1916
 Lohmanniidae Berlese, 1916

 Euptyctima Grandjean, 1967

 Mesoplophoroidea Ewing, 1917
 Mesoplophoridae Ewing, 1917

 Euphthiracaroidea Jacot, 1930
 Oribotritiidae Grandjean, 1954
 Euphthiracaridae Jacot, 1930
 Synichotritiidae Walker, 1965

 Phthiracaroidea Perty, 1841
 Phthiracaridae Perty, 1841
 Steganacaridae Niedbała, 1986

Holosomata Grandjean, 1969

 Crotonioidea Thorell, 1876
 Thrypochthoniidae Willmann, 1931
 Malaconothridae Berlese, 1916
 Nothridae Berlese, 1896
 Camisiidae Oudemans, 1900
 Crotoniidae Thorell, 1876

 Nanhermannioidea Sellnick, 1928
 Nanhermanniidae Sellnick, 1928

 Hermannioidea Sellnick, 1928
 Hermanniidae Sellnick, 1928

Brachypylina Hull, 1918

 Pycnonoticae Grandjean, 1954
 Hermannielloidea Grandjean, 1934 (2 families)
 Neoliodoidea Sellnick, 1928 (1 family)
 Plateremaeoidea Trägårdh, 1926 (4 families)
 Gymnodamaeoidea Grandjean, 1954 (2 families)
 Damaeoidea Berlese, 1896 (1 family)
 Polypterozetoidea Grandjean, 1959 (2 families)
 Cepheoidea Berlese, 1896 (7 families)
 Charassobatoidea Grandjean, 1958 (3 families)
 Microzetoidea Grandjean, 1936 (1 family)
 Zetorchestoidea Michael, 1898 (1 family)
 Gustavioidea Oudemans, 1900 (8 families)
 Eremaeoidea Oudemans, 1900 (4 families)
 Amerobelboidea Grandjean, 1954 (10 families)
 Eremelloidea Balogh, 1961 (7 families)
 Oppioidea Sellnick, 1937 (12 families)
 Trizetoidea Ewing, 1917 (6 families)
 Otocepheoidea Balogh, 1961 (4 families)
 Carabodoidea Koch, 1837 (3 families)
 Tectocepheoidea Grandjean, 1954 (2 families)
 Hydrozetoidea Grandjean, 1954 (1 family)
 Ameronothroidea Willmann, 1931 (3 families)
 Cymbaeremaeoidea Sellnick, 1928 (3 families)

 Poronoticae Grandjean, 1954
 Licneremaeoidea Grandjean, 1931 (6 families)
 Phenopelopoidea Petrunkevitch, 1955 (1 family)
 Unduloribatoidea Kunst, 1971 (3 families)
 Limnozetoidea Thor, 1937 (2 families)
 Achipterioidea Thor, 1929 (2 families)
 Oribatelloidea Jacot, 1925 (3 families)
 Ceratozetoidea Jacot, 1925 (5 families)
 Zetomotrichoidea Grandjean, 1934 (1 family)
 Oripodoidea Jacot, 1925 (19 families)
 Galumnoidea Jacot, 1925 (3 families)

See also

Archegozetes longisetosus
Conoppia palmicinctum

References

Further reading

Acariformes
Arachnid orders